Vittorio Scantamburlo (1 June 1930 – 1 October 2016) was an Italian football manager, player and scout, known for discovering Alessandro del Piero.

Career
Player of Luparense between Serie C and Promozione, in 1951 goes along with Aurelio Scagnellato at Calcio Padova in Serie A, where he remained as a player until 1953.

In 1970 it was called by Aurelio Scagnellato to coach the youth of Calcio Padova. Over the years, he will win two national titles with youth. Moreover, at the same time, it is also the activity of talent scouts. In addition, at the same time, it is also the activity of talent scouts. Over the years he has discovered more than 70 players, then finished among professionals and in Serie A.

List of players discovered
"In this list some of the most famous players discovered by Vittorio Scantamburlo"
Alessandro del Piero, Filippo Maniero, Ivone De Franceschi, Luigi Capuzzo, Adriano Zancopè, Carlo Perrone, Andrea Seno, Andrea Manzo, Luigi Sartor, Marco Rigoni, Marco Andreolli, Daniele Gastaldello, Luca Rossettini and Jerry Mbakogu.

Bibliography
His career has been written the book Ho scoperto Del Piero. La storia di Vittorio Scantamburlo.

References

External links
  Vittorio Scantamburlo at ilgazzettino.it
  Vittorio Scantamburlo at mattinopadova.gelocal.it

1930 births
2016 deaths
Calcio Padova players
Serie A players
Italian football managers
Association footballers not categorized by position
Italian footballers